The Indios de Oriente was a baseball club which played from 1956 through 1964 in the Venezuelan Professional Baseball League. They played its home games at the Estadio Municipal de Puerto La Cruz in Anzoátegui, Venezuela.

History
The Indios de Oriente replaced the Navegantes del Magallanes franchise for the 1956–1957 season. The team finished second in the first half with a 13-14 record, but slumped to 10-15 in the second half to finish last in the four-team league, out of contention. They improved to a 22-19 mark in 1957–1958, good for a second place and a playoff berth, but failed in the opening round.

In 1958–1959 Oriente finished second during the regular season. Then advanced to the playoffs and clinched the Championship title. As the league champions, the team represented Venezuela in the 1959 Caribbean Series played in Caracas.

With a low-profile squad, Oriente came in on an honourable second place behind Cuba's Alacranes de Almendares after finishing 4-2. Managed by Kerby Farrell, the offensive was anchored by RF/1B and Series MVP Norman Cash, who collected a .360 average and 11 RBI, while slugging .680. Babe Birrer was the top pitcher with a 2-0 record, including a 13-inning victory, a 1.25 ERA and 18 strikeouts in 21⅔ innings of work. Besides, 3B Luis ′′Camaleón′′ García and OF Jesús Mora tied for the batting title with a .417 average. All of them made the All-Star team.

The 1959–1960 VPBL season was suspended because of a players' strike. Returning to action the next season, the team finished second with a 29-23 record but lost the semifinal round to the eventual champion team, the Industriales de Valencia.

In 1961–1962, for the fourth time in team's history, the Indios ended in second place during the regular season after going 29-22. Lastly, Oriente was beaten by the Leones del Caracas in the best-of-seven championship series, four to one games.

The Indios de Oriente declined considerably in 1962–1963, posting an 8-25 record before retiring during the midseason.

Estrellas de Oriente
The franchise was renamed and restructured to become the Estrellas de Oriente for the 1963-64 season. They also were misspelled as the Estrellas Orientales or simply Oriente. Nonetheless, the changes did not create a more competitive team, as they finished fourth with a 21-29 record. At the end of the year, the franchise owners acquired the brand Navegantes del Magallanes and continued in the league the following season.

Yearly Team Records

Noted players

Joe Altobelli   
Steve Bailey 
Babe Birrer 
Oswaldo Blanco 
Carl Boles 
José Bracho 
Chico Carrasquel 
Néstor Chávez 
Harry Chiti 
Jimmie Coker 
Joe Collins 
Ray Crone 
Tony Curry 
Bob Darnell 
Bob Duliba 
Doc Edwards 
Dick Egan 
Harry Elliott 
Dick Fowler 
Jim Frey 
Luis García 
Bob Gibson 
Rod Graber 
Eli Grba 
Bert Hamric 
Jack Hiatt 
Aaron Pointer 
Julián Ladera 
Johnny Lewis 
Jack Lohrke 
Joe Lonnett 
Hank Mason 
Ramón Monzant 
Jesús Mora 
Manny Mota 
Mel Nelson 
Chi-Chi Olivo 
Jim Owens 
Aaron Pointer 
Dusty Rhodes 
Don Rudolph 
Johnny Schaive 
Wally Shannon 
Dick Simpson 
Dean Stone 
Jerry Snyder 
Ron Taylor 
Fred Valentine 
Gale Wade 
Ray Webster 
Mike White

Sources
Gutiérrez, Daniel; González, Javier (1992). Numeritos del béisbol profesional venezolano (1946-1992). LVBP, Caracas. 
Nuñez, José Antero (1994). Serie del Caribe de la Habana a Puerto La Cruz. JAN Editor.

External links
PuraPelota.com – Indios de Oriente
PuraPelota.com – Estrellas de Oriente
BeisbolVenezolano.net – Equipos del béisbol venezolano
XI Serie del Caribe 1959

1956 establishments in Venezuela
Defunct baseball teams in Venezuela
Baseball teams established in 1956